Mys-Chyorny is a rural locality (an inhabited locality) in administrative jurisdiction of the closed administrative-territorial formation of Ostrovnoy in Murmansk Oblast, Russia, located on the Kola Peninsula, beyond the Arctic Circle, at an elevation of  above sea level. As of the 2010 Census, its population was 8.

References

Notes

Sources
Official website of Murmansk Oblast. Registry of the Administrative-Territorial Structure of Murmansk Oblast 

Rural localities in Murmansk Oblast
